Heliocheilus toralis is a moth in the family Noctuidae. It is found in North America, including Arizona and Texas.

The wingspan is 23–25 mm.

External links
Image
Bug Guide

Heliocheilus
Moths of North America